Darren McCarthy (born 5 October 1990) is an Irish hurler who plays as a midfielder for the Cork senior team.

Born in Cork, McCarthy first played competitive Gaelic games during his schooling at Coláiste Chríost Rí. He arrived on the inter-county scene at the age of sixteen when he first linked up with the Cork minor team before later joining the under-21 side. He joined the senior panel during the 2012 league. McCarthy spent a number of years as sub-goalkeeper before being switched to the forwards.

At club level McCarthy is an All-Ireland medalist in the intermediate grade with Ballymartle. In addition to this he has also won one Munster medal and one championship medal in the premier intermediate grade.

Playing career

Club

McCarthy plays his club hurling with Ballymartle. In 2010 he was a member of the forward line as Ballymartle faced local rivals Tracton in the final of the premier intermediate championship. A 2-14 to 0-13 victory gave McCarthy a championship medal in that grade. Ballymartle later represented the county in the provincial series of games and faced Borrisokane in the decider. A 2-14 to 0-8 win gave McCarthy a Munster medal. Dicksboro provided the opposition in the subsequent All-Ireland decider and McCarthy played a key role in securing a last-minute goal. A 3-15 to 1-20 victory gave him an All-Ireland Intermediate Club Hurling Championship medal.

Inter-county

McCarthy first came to prominence on the inter-county scene as a member of the Cork minor hurling team in 2007. That year he lined out in his provincial decider against Tipperary. An 0-18 to 1-11 defeat was the result on that occasion. Cork remained in the championship and took the "back door" route to the All-Ireland final where they faced Tipp once again. A 3-14 to 2-11 defeat was the result on that occasion.

In 2008 McCarthy lined out in a second consecutive provincial decider with Tipperary providing the opposition once again. A narrow 0-19 to 0-18 victory resulted in a first Munster medal for McCarthy.

References

1990 births
Living people
Ballymartle hurlers
Carrigdhoun hurlers
Cork inter-county hurlers
People educated at Coláiste Chríost Rí